Thomas Melville or Melvill may refer to:

 Thomas Melvill (1726–1753), Scottish natural philosopher
 Thomas Melvill (American patriot) (1751–1832), American merchant, participant in the Boston Tea Party, Revolutionary War major and state legislator
 Thomas Melville, younger brother of Herman Melville
 Thomas Melville (Southgate) (died 1942), member of Southgate Urban District Council
 Thomas Melville (writer), American priest, activist and writer